Mbarara Regional Referral Hospital, commonly known as Mbarara Hospital, is a hospital in Mbarara in the Western Region of Uganda. It is the referral hospital for the region and specifically for the districts of Mbarara, Bushenyi, Ntungamo, Kiruhura, Ibanda, and Isingiro. The hospital serves as the teaching hospital for the Mbarara University of Science and Technology.

Location
The hospital is in Mbarara District, Ankole sub-region and is located within the central business district of the city. The geographical coordinates of Mbarara Hospital are0°36'59.0"S, 30°39'32.0"E (Latitude:-0.616389; Longitude:30.658889).

Overview
Mbarara Hospital is a public hospital, founded by the Uganda Ministry of Health, and general care in the hospital is free. It is affiliated with the medical school of the Mbarara University of Science and Technology, one of the four medical schools in Uganda. The hospital is staffed by medical students and residents. The hospital also acts as a teaching hospital for Nursing students from Bishop Stuart University.

Mbarara Hospital is one of the 15 internship Hospitals in Uganda where graduates of Ugandan medical schools can serve one year of internship under the supervision of qualified specialists and consultants. Its bed capacity is 600, although, as is the case with many Ugandan public hospitals, many more patients are admitted, with the excess sleeping on the floors. There is an acute shortage of functioning equipment for provision of tertiary healthcare services.

Renovations
In January 2011, President Yoweri Museveni laid the foundation stone at the hospital to mark the renovation, rehabilitation, and expansion of the hospital and transform it into a National Referral Hospital. The physical works were undertaken by the Excel Construction Company, a subsidiary of the Madhvani Group. The work, expected to take approximately 18 months, was  anticipated to be complete by the end of 2011. The hospital's bed capacity was increased from 300 to 608.

Photos
 Photo of Mbarara Hospital Grounds

See also
Hospitals in Uganda

References

External links
Mbarara Regional Referral Hospital To Get More Funding

Hospital buildings completed in 1940
Mbarara
Teaching hospitals in Uganda
Mbarara District
Western Region, Uganda
1940 establishments in Uganda